A quaternary carbon is a carbon atom bound to four other carbon atoms. For this reason, quaternary carbon atoms are found only in hydrocarbons having at least five carbon atoms. Quaternary carbon atoms can occur in branched alkanes, but not in linear alkanes.

Synthesis 
The formation of chiral quaternary carbon centers has been a synthetic challenge. Chemists have developed asymmetric Diels–Alder reactions, Heck reaction, Enyne cyclization, cycloaddition reactions, C–H activation, Allylic substitution,  Pauson–Khand reaction,  etc. to construct asymmetric quaternary carbon atoms.

References 

Chemical nomenclature
Organic chemistry